The PC-Flight Pretty Flight is a single-engined, two-seat ultralight aircraft, designed in Germany and built in Romania in the 1990s. Few have been built.

In 2011 the aircraft was listed as back in production as the GM&T International Pretty Flight.

Design and development
Production rights to the Pretty Flight have been held by several companies. It was designed by Calin Gologan and test flown by Peter Maderitch, whose first initials formed the original company name, PC-Flight.  This company ceased trading in 2005 but reformed as PCH-Flugzeubau to continue marketing the design. Production rights went to PC-Aero in Germany but PC-Aero signed an agreement in 2002 with GM&T International of Romania giving them the right to produce the design.

The Pretty Flight is a conventionally laid out, high-wing monoplane of all-metal construction, fitted with a single engine and seating two in side by side. The wing is braced with a single, faired lift strut on either side. Its skin is mostly metal apart from the rear part of the wings and the control surfaces. The wing tips are upturned and the fin swept. The wing carries full span flaperons, later replaced with conventional ailerons and flaps. It has a horn-balanced rudder. The cabin seats two in side-by-side configuration. Its tricycle landing gear has cantilever spring main legs and a cantilever nose leg, with wheels in fairings. The Pretty Flight has a ballistic recovery parachute.

While it has been built with the Rotax 912iS  aircraft engine, in 2015 it was also advertised with the  Walter Mikron III.

The first flight was in November 1996. Pretty Flight parts were originally produced by Star Tech Impex of Romania and assembled by Nitsche Flugzeubau in Germany. One  prototype, one production aircraft and three pre-series aircraft had been built when German certification was achieved in September 1998. A batch of ten production aircraft was established in November 1998 but later suspended at least until the rights change to GM&T; it is not known how many production Pretty Flights were completed. The GM&T demonstrator D-MNPF was the 1996 first prototype.

Operational history
The GM&T aircraft was exhibited at AERO Friedrichshafen, in April 2005, but was not present in 2007. By mid-2010 there were 5 Pretty Flights on the German civil aviation register but none elsewhere in Europe.

Specifications

References

External links

1990s German sport aircraft
High-wing aircraft
Single-engined tractor aircraft
Aircraft first flown in 1996